Morrey is a surname. Notable people with the name include:

Bernard Morrey (1927-2011), English footballer
Charles B. Morrey, Jr. (1907-1984), American mathematician
Humphrey Morrey (c. 1650-1716), first mayor of Philadelphia
Stephen Morrey (1880–1921), Saskatchewan farmer and politician

See also
Morey (disambiguation), includes a list of people with surname Morey